U.S. Bicycle Route 23 (USBR 23) is a north-south United States Bicycle Route that travels through Middle Tennessee and the Pennyroyal Plateau of region of Kentucky in the United States.

The Tennessee segment was designated on October 17, 2013 as the first national bicycle route in the state. The Kentucky segment was designated May 2019.

Kentucky
Within Kentucky the route is named the Cave Country Bike Tour. The northernmost portion of the route runs along the eastern portion of the TransAmerica Trail's Mammoth Cave Loop route.

Tennessee

Spurs
 Spur to Natchez Trace is a  connector to the Natchez Trace Parkway.
 Spur to Henry Horton State Park is  alternative route to Henry Horton State Park.

References

External links

 Bicycle Routes - Tennessee Department of Transportation
 On Road Bicycle Routes and Events - Kentucky Transportation Cabinet

23
Bike paths in Tennessee
Bike paths in Kentucky